The Song of the Birds is a 1935 Color Classics cartoon. It concerns a destructive little boy with an air rifle who shoots a baby bird and is mortified when the bird's parents, and all the other birds, go into mourning.

Plot
A flock of birds is teaching their young chicks to fly. The sun is shining, and all the birds are cheerfully singing. Meanwhile, a boy is having fun with an air rifle, shooting at everything in the house and destroying many of the items in the house. Then he goes out into the garden and shoots at the nest that the birds have barely saved. Then he shoots at a chick out of the sky, only to realize the gravity of what he has done. The chick's parents try to revive it, but to no avail.

The sky turns dark and stormy as the birds assemble and wail in mourning for the chick's funeral, completing it with pallbearers and a grave digger. The boy is tormented by the birds' wailing. Watching from outside the window, he is brought to tears, and he gets on his knees to pray. As the birds prepare to lower the chick into its grave, it begins raining. The young chick miraculously comes back to life, the birds resume to their cheerful singing, the sky clears, and the boy, having learned this lesson, breaks his air rifle into pieces and pulls out a box of bird seeds for all the birds to enjoy. The chick and the boy share a seed as the cartoon ends.

References

External links

1935 animated films
1930s American animated films
1930s animated short films
1935 films
Color Classics cartoons
Paramount Pictures short films
Fleischer Studios short films
Short films directed by Dave Fleischer